Studies in Romanticism is a journal of English Literature and Romanticism launched in 1961. It is a quarterly journal, published by Johns Hopkins University Press for Boston University. The founder was David Bonnell Green.

References

External links
 Official website

Literary magazines published in the United States
Quarterly magazines published in the United States
Boston University
Magazines established in 1961
Magazines published in Boston